Newcastle upon Tyne West  was a parliamentary constituency in the city of Newcastle upon Tyne from 1918 to 1983 which returned one Member of Parliament (MP) to the House of Commons of the Parliament of the United Kingdom.

History 
Parliament created this constituency in the Representation of the People Act 1918 as one of four divisions of the parliamentary borough of Newcastle-upon-Tyne, which had previously been represented by one two-member seat. It was abolished for the 1983 general election, when the closest successor constituency was Newcastle-upon-Tyne North.

Boundaries

1918–1950 

 The County Borough of Newcastle upon Tyne wards of Armstrong, Arthur's Hill, Benwell, Elswick, and Fenham.

Included the former Urban District of Benwell and Fenham which had been absorbed into the County Borough in 1904 and had previously been part of the abolished Tyneside constituency.

1950–1955 

 the County Borough of Newcastle upon Tyne wards of Benwell, Fenham, Kenton, and Scotswood; and 
 the Urban District of Newburn.

Boundaries redrawn to take account of expansion of the County Borough and redistribution of wards. Armstrong transferred to Newcastle upon Tyne Central and Arthur's Hill and Elswick to Newcastle upon Tyne North. Gained Newburn from the abolished constituency of Wansbeck.

1955–1983 

 the County Borough of Newcastle upon Tyne wards of Fenham, Kenton, and Scotswood; and 
 the Urban District of Newburn.

Benham ward transferred to Newcastle upon Tyne Central.

Abolition 
Following the reorganisation of local authorities as a result of the Local Government Act 1972, the constituencies within the City of Newcastle upon Tyne were completely redrawn and the constituency was abolished. About half the electorate, comprising the former Urban District of Newburn was included in a newly constituted Newcastle upon Tyne North. Fenham and Kenton were transferred to Newcastle upon Tyne Central and Scotswood to the new constituency of Tyne Bridge.

Members of Parliament

Election results

Elections in the 1910s

Elections in the 1920s

Elections in the 1930s

Elections in the 1940s 
General Election 1939–40:
Another General Election was required to take place before the end of 1940. The political parties had been making preparations for an election to take place from 1939 and by the end of this year, the following candidates had been selected; 
Conservative: Joseph Leech
Labour: Henry Hird

At the outbreak of the Second World War the planned election was postponed and the major parties agreed to an electoral truce, where they would not contest by-elections against each other for the duration of the war. This meant that following Joseph Leech's death in May 1940 neither Labour nor the Liberal Party stood candidates, and the Conservative candidate was unopposed.

Elections in the 1950s

Elections in the 1960s

Elections in the 1970s

See also

 History of parliamentary constituencies and boundaries in Northumberland

References

Sources 
 

Parliamentary constituencies in Tyne and Wear (historic)
Constituencies of the Parliament of the United Kingdom established in 1918
Constituencies of the Parliament of the United Kingdom disestablished in 1983
Politics of Newcastle upon Tyne